John Cheney may refer to:

John Cheyne (speaker), (died 1414) aka John Cheney
John Cheyne, Baron Cheyne, also written John Cheney, Baron Cheney
John Cheney (gentleman at arms), 16th century gentleman at arms, politician and murderer
John Cheney (engraver) (1801–1885), American engraver
John Moses Cheney (1859–1922), American judge
John Sherwood Cheney (1827–1910), American businessman and politician 
John Vance Cheney (1848–1922), American librarian

See also
John Cheyne (disambiguation)
John Chaney (disambiguation)